Victim to Villain is the second full-length album by American rock band New Years Day, released on June 11, 2013, through Century Media Records, their first and only for the label. This is the first official full-length from New Years Day in six years.

This album continues the departure from the pop-punk sound of the band's first album, into a darker, heavier sound that began with the preceding EP, The Mechanical Heart. The first single from the album, "Do Your Worst" was released in January 2013 with a lyric video featuring Ashley in a grave, followed by "I'm No Good" on May 6, 2013, also with a lyric video with scenes of all the band members. "Death of The Party" was released as the third single with a lyric video and "Angel Eyes" was released as the fourth and final single of the album with an accompanying music video.

Track listing
All songs written by New Years Day and Erik Ron, except where noted
"Do Your Worst" - 3:16
"I'm No Good" - 3:45
"Bloody Mary" - 3:13
"Victims" - 3:58
"Hello Darkness" - 3:21
"Death of the Party" - 3:14
"The Arsonist" (New Years Day, Erik Ron and Jason Evigan) - 3:24
"Angel Eyes" (feat. Chris Motionless of Motionless in White)(New Years Day, Erik Ron and Joel Faviere)  - 2:57
"Any Last Words?" - 2:50
"Tombstone" - 1:45
"Last Great Love Story" - 3:17

Personnel
Ash Costello - lead vocals
Nikki Misery - lead guitar
Jake Jones - rhythm guitar
Anthony Barro - bass, backing vocals
Russell Dixon - drums

Additional Personnel
 Chris Motionless - guest vocals on "Angel Eyes"

Album information
Produced, recorded, and mixed by Erik Ron
Recorded at Grey Area Studios, North Hollywood, CA
Engineered by Adrian Alvarado
Mastered by Alan Douches at West West Side Music, New Windsor, NY

References

2013 albums
New Years Day (band) albums